Kleopatra and Pharaoh are a two volume novel by historical novelist Karen Essex, author of Leonardo's Swans and Stealing Athena.  The books emphasize the Egyptian queen’s Greek roots as a descendant of Alexander the Great and re-imagine her as an astute ruler and diplomat.

References 
1. Author website, KarenEssex.com

External links
 
 Review of Kleopatra About.com
 Review of Pharaoh About.com
 Review at thebookhaven.net

2001 American novels
2002 American novels
Novels set in ancient Egypt